Burmannia capitata is a plant species widespread across the West Indies and much of Latin America. It grows in wet areas at elevations less than 100 m. It has been reported from Argentina, Belize, Bolivia, Brazil, Cuba, the Dominican Republic, Haiti, Jamaica, Puerto Rico, Trinidad & Tobago, Colombia, Costa Rica, French Guiana, Guyana, Honduras, southern Mexico (Campeche, Chiapas, Veracruz, Tabasco), Nicaragua, Panamá, Paraguay, Suriname, Venezuela, and the United States (North Carolina, South Carolina, Georgia, Florida, Alabama, Mississippi, Louisiana, Puerto Rico, Texas, Oklahoma)

Burmannia capitata is an annual herb up to 35 cm tall. It has 0-3 basal leaves plus several cauline (stem) leaves, all lanceolate, up to 8 mm long. Inflorescence is a small cyme frequently resembling a head, with up to 25 flowers. Flowers are 3-ribbed or slightly 3-winged. Flowers are white, about 1 mm in diameter.

References

Burmanniaceae
Flora of Central America
Flora of South America
Flora of the Caribbean
Plants described in 1791
Flora of the Southeastern United States
Flora of the South-Central United States
Flora of the North-Central United States
Flora of Veracruz
Flora of Southeastern Mexico
Flora without expected TNC conservation status